The Italianate House at 608 Academy Street, Valparaiso, Indiana was constructed by Conrad and Catherine Bloch in about 1873.  The double-pile brick house has a commanding presence on a double lot at the corner of Park and Academy Streets.  A brick woodhouse dates to about the same period as the house.  The garage dates from about 1940.  The house was converted to the Valparaiso Hospital and Sanitarium by Dr. Harvey Cook in about 1923.  It has been converted back to a single family home.

Conrad and Catherine Bloch came to Valparaiso and opened a store.  They built their brick home in the Italianate style.  About 1923, Luther Bloch Jr., a grandson leased the building to Dr. Harvey Cook.  Dr. Cook opened it as a hospital.  The doctor lived east of the hospital at Morgan and Chicago Streets.  Structural changes were made to accommodate the hospital.  When it closed I the early 1930s, it was turned into apartments.  It continued in use as apartments until 1975.  In 1977, it was converted back to single-family use.  A student apartment remains on the upper floor.

Exterior
The house faces Academy Street to the west. The foundation is brick with a blend of colors using salmon, red, orange and tans. The main entry and front windows are trimmed in arched stone half-rounds and sills. The window arches rest on thin engaged stone columns. Some windows have paired engaged columns between. The other facades have less ornate trim. Paired scrolled wood brackets support a wide overhanging eave. The house is covered by a low-sloped hipped roof.

Buildings and districts on the NRHP

 Haste-Crumpacker House
 Heritage Hall 
 Immanuel Lutheran Church 
 Dr. David J. Loring Residence and Clinic 
 William McCallum House
 Charles S. and Mary McGill House
 Porter County Jail and Sheriff's House 
 Porter County Memorial Opera Hall 
 David Garland Rose House
 DeForest Skinner House 
 Valparaiso Downtown Commercial District
 Washington Street Historic District (Valparaiso, Indiana)

References

Houses on the National Register of Historic Places in Indiana
Italianate architecture in Indiana
Houses completed in 1885
Houses in Porter County, Indiana
Buildings and structures in Valparaiso, Indiana
National Register of Historic Places in Porter County, Indiana